is an arcade video game released by Taito in 1992. The game takes place on September 5, 1953 "in a big city somewhere". It features a group of detectives who set out to fight a crime family. The game has a strong film noir vibe, shown through the appearance of the detectives and the featuring of a female protagonist. Each stage is preceded by a short cinematic interlude that explains the transition between the game's different locales.

Summary
The in-game maneuvers were unusually diverse for a sprite-based shoot 'em up game of the era.  When the player moves his character to within arm's length of an enemy, the shoot button triggers a melee attack.  The player can also lie prone to evade gunfire, and perform a diving somersault in order to quickly take cover behind tables, plants, pillars, statues, and other fixtures.

Instead of using scrolling each stage takes place against a non-moving but richly detailed backdrop—beginning with the lavish interior of a posh hotel.  Most of the environment is destructible and the scenery becomes visibly degraded by bullet holes throughout the prolonged firefights.

The game seems to take specific inspiration from the 1987 mobster film The Untouchables. Two of the main characters bear an unmistakable resemblance to Andy Garcia and Kevin Costner who both starred in that film as George Stone/Giuseppe Petri and Eliot Ness, respectively.

Reception 

In Japan, Game Machine listed Dead Connection on their October 1, 1992 issue as being the seventeenth most-successful table arcade unit of the month.

Notes

References

External links

Dead Connection at GameFAQs

1992 video games
Arcade video games
Arcade-only video games
Shoot 'em ups
Video games about police officers
Video games set in 1953
Taito arcade games
Video games developed in Japan